Kalindi Kunj is a public garden and a famous T point road in Delhi, located on the banks of River Yamuna, close to Okhla barrage.

Atlantic Water World, an amusement park incorporating a water park, is located there.

Gallery
Atlantic Water World:

Delhi Eye:

References

External links
 Kalindi Kunj Park at wikimapia
 Delhi Rides

Parks in Delhi
Gardens in India